Drop is a coalition customer loyalty program, in which users earn points using their linked debit or credit cards. Users choose five rewards partners such as Sephora, Starbucks, Uber, and Whole Foods Market to earn points with. The program started in the Canadian market during August 2015 and expanded into the American market during October 2017, after a six-month private beta. The Drop Rewards program requires that users download a companion app on an iOS or Android device. According to Drop, the service was designed as a way for brands to earn exposure with millennials.

As of November 2017, the company had 500,000 users. This number has since risen to 1 million users as of January 2018.

Funding 
In August 2015, Drop raised a CA$1 million round of initial financing for launching the app.

In October 2017, Drop raised a $5.5 million seed round of venture capital financing led by Sierra Ventures. As part of the deal, Mark Fernandes joined Drop's Board.

In February 2018, the company announced that they had raised a US$21 million series A round, led by New Enterprise Associates. Later that year Drop acquired customer analytics company Canopy Labs.

In August 2019, the company announced their series B round which was a total of US$44 million, led by HOF Capital and Royal Bank of Canada (RBC) participated as a strategic investor.

References 

Customer loyalty programs
Customer loyalty programs in Canada
Companies based in Toronto
Canadian companies established in 2015
IOS software
Android (operating system) software